Amateur Hour may refer to:

 Amateur hour, a live show performed by audience members
 "Amateur Hour" (song), a 1974 song by Sparks
 Amateur Hour (album), a comedy album by Bob Odenkirk and Brandon Wardell
 The Original Amateur Hour, an American radio and television program